Kumbaran is an unclassified Southern Dravidian language spoken by a Scheduled caste of India.

References

Dravidian languages